David L. Felten is an American neuroscientist.
He is associate dean of clinical sciences at the University of Medicine and Health Sciences, and was formerly associate dean of research at Oakland University and vice president for research and medical director of the Beaumont Research Institute.

He received a B.S. from the Massachusetts Institute of Technology in 1969, an M.D. from the University of Pennsylvania School of Medicine in 1973, and a Ph.D. from the Institute of Neurological Sciences at the University of Pennsylvania in 1974. He is on the advisory board of the Medingen Group.

He was co-founder and co-editor of Brain, Behavior, and Immunity.

He had a profound spiritual experience in 2013 while visiting Rome and subsequently converted to Roman Catholic Christianity.

Awards
 1983 MacArthur Fellows Program
 NIH MERIT award
 "Building Bridges of Integration Award" by the Traditional Chinese Medicine World Foundation

Works

References

Oakland University faculty
Perelman School of Medicine at the University of Pennsylvania alumni
Seton Hall University faculty
University of California, Irvine faculty
University of Rochester faculty
American neuroscientists
MacArthur Fellows
Living people
Massachusetts Institute of Technology alumni
Year of birth missing (living people)
Indiana University faculty
Loma Linda University faculty